King's Barbecue is a sit-down barbecue restaurant in Petersburg, Virginia.

History
In 1946, brothers John and Clinton King took over the business of their former employer, Alford's Barbeque, and christened it King's. They adopted the sauce of Alford's, which had also been purchased by C. F. Sauer Company.

References
Notes

External links
 King's Barbecue (official site)

Barbecue